The Terre Haute Tots were a baseball team in Terre Haute, Indiana from 1921–1937 after being established in 1919 as the Terre Haute Browns.  They were a Three-I League team; while they were unaffiliated for most of their existence; in 1937, they were affiliated with the St. Louis Browns.

The ballpark

The Tots' games were played at Memorial Stadium ballpark in Terre Haute.

Notable alumni

Hall of Fame Alumni
Mordecai Brown (1919–20) Inducted, 1949
Notable Alumni

Watty Clark (1926) 
Bob Coleman (1922) 
Wes Ferrell (1928) 2 x MLB All-Star; Most Career HR by a pitcher (37)
Walter Holke (1932, 1937) 
George Hale (1925)
Bob Kahle
Elmer Klumpp
 Roxie Lawson (1930)
Walt Meinert
Bill Mizeur (1924-1926)
Dink O'Brien (1924) 
Charlie Root (1921-1922) 1927 NL Wins Leader
Art Reinholz
Oscar Siemer (1932) 
Carr Smith (1927) 
Fred Tauby (1926)
Dizzy Trout (1935) 2 x MLB All Star; 1943 AL Wins Leader; 1944 AL ERA Leader
Bill Trotter
Phil Weintraub (1932)
Jerry Witte (1937) 
Earl Wolgamot

Year-by-year record

References

Defunct minor league baseball teams
Defunct baseball teams in Indiana
Professional baseball teams in Indiana
St. Louis Browns minor league affiliates
1921 establishments in Indiana
1937 disestablishments in Indiana
Baseball teams established in 1921
Baseball teams disestablished in 1937
Terre Haute, Indiana
Illinois-Indiana-Iowa League teams